John Stirling OBE was a British police officer. Stirling joined the police in c.1882 and served as Chief Constable of Great Grimsby Borough Police from 1900 until his retirement on 11 July 1930. Seven officers who had begun their careers under him became Chief Constables of other forces during his term of office.<ref>The Times, 9 July 1930</ref>

He was appointed Officer of the Order of the British Empire (OBE) in the 1920 civilian war honours.

Footnotes

References
Notice of retirement, The Times'', 11 April 1930

British Chief Constables
Officers of the Order of the British Empire
Year of death missing
Year of birth missing